Bangladesh Navy frigate program is a planned project of building 6 multi-role stealth guided missile frigate for Bangladesh Navy. In 2017, plan for the frigate project under the Forces Goal 2030 officially announced. Bangladesh Navy is inspecting proposals from several companies to evolve their designs into a prospective design for the proposed six guided-missile frigates.

Development 
Chittagong Dry Dock Limited (CDDL) has been selected as prime contractor for the frigate program of Bangladesh Navy. The frigates will be equipped with state of the art military hardware, sensors, electronic warfare systems etc. The lifespan of each frigate is estimated to be 30 years in average. The project has been delayed due to some geo-political and recent changes in foreign policies. At the beginning of the project, it was estimated that all of the frigates will be built with Chinese technical assistance and complete transfer of technology but the program was revised in 2017, following the Rohingya refugee crisis. In 2018, Commodore Mohammad Nazmul Karim said, two frigates will be commissioned in 2022, two by 2025 and two by 2030. However, Bangladesh Navy made some new requirements on the project mainly to focus on NATO standards. As a result, many renowned shipbuilding companies from European countries have shown interest. The project has become a major priority of Ministry of Defence and Prime Minister's Office. Despite delays on starting the construction of the frigates, it is confirmed that all of the frigates will be completed by 2030.

Contenders 
In this multi-billion dollar project, companies from several countries have submitted proposals for conceptual designs to Bangladesh Navy under joint venture program, complete transfer of technology as well as technical assistance and maintenance support. Renowned shipbuilding companies from Netherlands, France, Italy, Turkey and United Kingdom have shown interest.

Potential warship designs 
List of latest frigate classes available for export from the mentioned countries:

 Istanbul-class frigate / MILGEM project: STM with Istanbul Naval Shipyard, Turkey.
Arrowhead 140 frigate design: Babcock International, United Kingdom.
 Sigma 11515 frigate design: Damen Group, Netherlands
Italian FREMM design: Fincantieri, Italy.
French FREMM design: Naval Group, France.
French FDI Frigate design: Naval Group, France.

References

Ships of the Bangladesh Navy
Frigates of the Bangladesh Navy
Proposed ships